Farnham railway station serves the town of Farnham in Surrey, England.

Train services are provided by South Western Railway, with direct trains running to Guildford, Aldershot, Alton, Woking, Surbiton, Clapham Junction and London Waterloo.

Trains are formed of  electric multiple units. Steam trains and freight trains are seen quite often, travelling from/to the Watercress Line and Holybourne oil terminal.

There is a buffet in the booking hall selling newspapers, hot and cold beverages, confectionery, snacks, hot food and tobacco products.

The station parking has been expanded with the addition of a dual level car park facility, including better lighting, security cameras and improved entrance.

History 
The line from Aldershot station opened in 1870 and was electrified on 4 July 1937. Passenger services via Ash Green Halt and Tongham ceased on the same date.

Farnham station in fiction

Sherlock Holmes 

Sherlock Holmes and Doctor Watson travelled by train to Farnham in The Adventure of the Solitary Cyclist.  Holmes said, "A beautiful neighbourhood and full of the most interesting associations. You remember, Watson, that it was near there that we took Archie Stamford, the forger." Watson recounted, "We had ascertained from the lady that she went down upon the Monday by the train which leaves Waterloo at 9.50, so I started early and caught the 9:13."  He did this on Monday, 25 April 1895.

Sherlock Holmes, as a young boy, also lived in the Farnham area with his aunt and uncle in Andrew Lane's Young Sherlock Holmes series of books. The station features prominently as Holmes, his friend, and his tutor often travel by train to  when they are going to visit Holmes's brother Mycroft.

Services 

The typical off-peak service (Monday to Saturday) from the station is of two trains per hour to London Waterloo, and two per hour to Alton. There are also two trains per hour to Guildford.

Buses

Stagecoach Buses routes 5; 17; 18; 19; and 46 serve the station.

References

External links 

Railway stations in Surrey
DfT Category C2 stations
Former London and South Western Railway stations
Railway stations in Great Britain opened in 1849
Railway stations served by South Western Railway
Farnham
Buildings and structures in Farnham
1849 establishments in England